"Saw a New Morning" is the 1973 single released by the Bee Gees. It was also the group's first single released on Robert Stigwood's newly created records label RSO Records. The Bee Gees moved to Los Angeles in 1972 to record the album Life in a Tin Can which was a new direction for the group, who had been recording in England since 1967. The B-side, "My Life Has Been a Song" features lead vocal by Robin Gibb as well as Barry Gibb.

Composition and recording
This song contains melodic ideas that the group would revisit on the later track "Edge of the Universe". Written in 1972 and recorded around September the same year. On the song, Maurice Gibb played the bass part through electric piano with Jim Keltner's drums providing a thump. While backing guitarist Alan Kendall plays guitar with Barry and Maurice Gibb.

Reception
This single was the first and only single from the album, the single did not fare well and stalled at #94 in the US, while it did not chart at all in the UK. Ironically, while the single flopped in most of the world, it reached #1 in Hong Kong, as did their next single "Wouldn't I Be Someone", which also flopped in both the US and UK.

In April 1973, they performed the song on The Midnight Special and The Tonight Show Starring Johnny Carson, in addition to a 1973 TV special called Love Sounds Special in Japan.

Billboard commented on the Bee Gees "distinct vocal blend" and the backing instrumentation that "sounds like a symphonic orchestra."  Cash Box said that "the accent is on melody and three part harmony as Robin, Barry & Maurice prove that they're still one of the finest vocal groups around."

Personnel
 Barry Gibb — lead, harmony and backing vocals, acoustic guitar
 Robin Gibb — lead, harmony and backing vocals
 Maurice Gibb — harmony and backing vocals, bass acoustic guitar
 Alan Kendall — acoustic guitar
 Jim Keltner — drums
 Johnny Pate — orchestral arrangement

Charts

Weekly charts

Year-end charts

References

Bee Gees songs
1973 singles
Songs written by Barry Gibb
Songs written by Robin Gibb
Songs written by Maurice Gibb
Song recordings produced by Barry Gibb
Song recordings produced by Robin Gibb
Song recordings produced by Maurice Gibb
1973 songs
RSO Records singles